Francis Burleigh, sometimes spelled Burghley, was born in London around 1552. He studied at St. Catherine's College, Cambridge, then Queens' College, Cambridge, and finally Pembroke College, Cambridge. "He graduated B.A. in 1583, proceeded M.A. in 1587 and B.D. in 1594. He eventually became doctor of divinity in 1607 shortly after he had commenced his work on the translation" (http://kingjamesbibletranslators.org/bios/Francis_Burley/).

He was an English Vicar, appointed in 1590 to Bishop's Stortford by Lancelot Andrewes. He was among Andrewes' "First Westminster Company", charged by James I of England with the translation of the first 12 books of the King James Version of the Bible.

References
 McClure, Alexander. (1858) The Translators Revived: A Biographical Memoir of the Authors of the English Version of the Holy Bible. Mobile, Alabama: R. E. Publications (republished by the Marantha Bible Society, 1984 ASIN B0006YJPI8 )
 Nicolson, Adam. (2003) God's Secretaries: The Making of the King James Bible. New York: HarperCollins 
 http://kingjamesbibletranslators.org/bios/Francis_Burley/ 
 https://www.amazon.com/King-James-Bible-Translators-Opfell/dp/0899500412

Year of birth uncertain
1550s births
17th-century English Anglican priests
Writers from London
Translators of the King James Version
Year of death unknown
17th-century English translators
16th-century English clergy
Alumni of St Catharine's College, Cambridge
Alumni of Queens' College, Cambridge
Alumni of Pembroke College, Cambridge